Plužnje is a settlement in the hills above the right bank of the Idrijca River in the Municipality of Cerkno in the traditional Littoral region of Slovenia.

References

External links
Plužnje at Geopedia

Populated places in the Municipality of Cerkno